Mother Juno is an album by The Gun Club, released in 1987. It was produced by Robin Guthrie of the Cocteau Twins.

"Yellow Eyes" was originally entitled "Funky Junkie"; "Nobody's City" was originally "Sleepy Times Blues." The original recordings of Mother Juno were released as Mother Berlin in 2015 on Bang! Records, containing an additional track, "Country One."

Production
The album was recorded in Berlin. The recording took 14 days. The cover used a painting by Claus Castenskiold, the Danish-born painter.

Release
The album did well on the independent and college charts, peaking at #3 on the UK indie and #1 on the CMJ charts.

Critical reception
Trouser Press wrote: "On songs like 'The Breaking Hands' ... producer Robin Guthrie of the Cocteau Twins spins a delicately layered web of sound; more straightforward numbers like the shimmying 'Thunderhead' recast the old energy in slightly more linear terms, although guest Blixa Bargeld does his best to tilt 'Yellow Eyes' on its axis." The Rolling Stone Album Guide called the album "swamp music for thinking people."

Track listing

Original 1987 album
All tracks composed by Jeffrey Lee Pierce
 "Bill Bailey" – 3:39
 "Thunderhead" – 3:28
 "Lupita Screams" – 3:12
 "Yellow Eyes" – 6:30
 "The Breaking Hands" – 4:12
 "Araby" – 3:01
 "Heart" – 3:59
 "My Cousin Kim" – 2:47
 "Port of Souls" – 4:49

2005 Remaster (SFTRI 765)
All tracks composed by Jeffrey Lee Pierce
 "Bill Bailey" 
 "Thunderhead" 
 "Lupita Screams"
 "Yellow Eyes"
 "The Breaking Hands"
 "Araby" 
 "Heart" 
 "My Cousin Kim"
 "Port of Souls"
 "Crabdance"
 "Nobody's City"

Personnel 
The Gun Club
 Jeffrey Lee Pierce - vocals, guitar, whistle
 Kid Congo Powers - guitar
 Romi Mori - bass; lead guitar on "The Breaking Hands"
 Nick Sanderson - drums
with:
 Blixa Bargeld - guitar on "Yellow Eyes"
Technical
Lincoln Fong - engineer 
André Giere - assistant engineer
Claus Castenskiold - sleeve painting

References 

1987 albums
The Gun Club albums
Albums produced by Robin Guthrie